Bernard Evans (4 January 1937 – 24 July 2019) was an English footballer who played for Oxford United, Wrexham, Queens Park Rangers, Tranmere Rovers and Crewe Alexandra.

References

External links

Rage Online profile

1937 births
2019 deaths
Sportspeople from Chester
English footballers
Association football forwards
Crewe Alexandra F.C. players
Queens Park Rangers F.C. players
Oxford United F.C. players
Wrexham A.F.C. players
Tranmere Rovers F.C. players
English Football League players
Guildford City F.C. players